Epipactis muelleri is a species of orchid. This species is native to many countries in Europe. The species is threatened by destruction of forests with its population on decline, although the overall risk of its extinction on a global level is very low.

References 

muelleri
Orchids of Europe